Richard Morton Soash Sr. (August 3, 1941 – October 1, 2019) was an American rancher, farmer and politician.

Soash was born on the Soash ranch near Steamboat Springs, Colorado. He graduated from Steamboat Springs High School and from Colorado State University. Soash was a rancher and farmer. He served in the Colorado Senate from 1976 until 1984 and was a Democrat. He died in Florida.

Notes

External links

1941 births
2019 deaths
People from Steamboat Springs, Colorado
Colorado State University alumni
Farmers from Colorado
Ranchers from Colorado
Democratic Party Colorado state senators